Now Playing is an album by American pianist Dave Grusin released in 2004, recorded for GRP Records. The album features Grusin on solo piano, performing music he composed for various films. This is the only solo piano album Grusin has recorded.

Track listing
All music composed by Dave Grusin
"On Golden Pond" (main theme from On Golden Pond) - 3:48
"New Hampshire Hornpipe" (from On Golden Pond) - 2:31
"The Heart is a Lonely Hunter" (from The Heart is a Lonely Hunter) - 4:45
"Lupita" (from The Milagro Beanfield War) - 1:20
"Pistolero" (from The Milagro Beanfield War) - 2:01
"Milagro" (from The Milagro Beanfield War) - 2:47
"Memphis Stomp" (from The Firm) - 3:36
"Se Fue" (from Havana) - 3:17
"Hurricane Country" (from Havana) - 4:58
"It Might Be You" (from Tootsie) - 5:20
"Theme from Mulholland Falls" - 4:15
"Random Hearts" (from Random Hearts) - 4:08
"Heaven Can Wait" (main theme from Heaven Can Wait) - 4:10
"Letting Go" (from The Champ) - 3:06
"Mud Island Chase" (from The Firm) - 3:55

Personnel
Dave Grusin - piano (Steinway 459)

References
Dave Grusin-Now Playing at All Music

External links
Now Playing review at JPC

2004 albums
GRP Records albums
Dave Grusin albums